Chorthippus dichrous is a species of slant-faced grasshopper in the family Acrididae. It is found in the Palearctic.

References

External links

 

Acrididae